Harris Academy Sutton  is a coeducational secondary school located in Sutton in the London Borough of Sutton, England. It is part of the Harris Federation. It opened to pupils in September 2019.

The academy building, that cost £40 million, was constructed as part of the proposed London Cancer Hub project; a global centre for innovation in cancer research and treatment. It is built to passivhaus standards.

Description
The building is relatively new and currently hosts half of its capacity. Each year group contains approximately 200 students, with one year being an exception and has approximately 250. The school has made a promotional video of the facilities  When not required by the school, rooms and spaces are available for commercial hire.

The Academy is on the London Cancer Hub site, which is a partnership between the London Borough of Sutton and the Institute of Cancer Research, supported by the Royal Marsden NHS Foundation Trust, the Greater London Authority, and Epsom & St Helier University Hospitals NHS Trust. It is a specialist STEM school, and its co-location on the Hub's site aims to boost scientific learning.

Academics
The school is in its fourth year, and is running classes from Year 7 to Year 11, or Key Stage 3 to the start of Key Stage 4.

References

External links
 

Secondary schools in the London Borough of Sutton
Sutton
Educational institutions established in 2017
2017 establishments in England
Free schools in London